Al-Adil Sayf ad-Din Tuman bay was the twenty fifth  Mamluk Sultan of Egypt from the Burji dynasty. He ruled for about one hundred days in 1501.

Tuman Bay I was  about forty years old when he was selected as Sultan.
Although he was popular before becoming a Sultan, he soon lost that popularity due to his cruel measures, which was manifested in condemning one of the princes to death by hanging for alleged conspiracy.

He was overthrown and succeeded by Al-Ashraf Qansuh al-Ghawri.

Sources

16th-century Mamluk sultans
Burji sultans